Angelito may refer to:

People
 Angelito Gatlabayan (born 1952), Filipino politician
 Angelito Lampon (born 1950), Filipino Catholic prelate and Archbishop of Cotabato
 Angelito Sarmiento (1947–2015), Filipino politician
 Lito Sisnorio (1982–2007), Filipino boxer who died during a bout
 Angelito Azteca, another ring name of Super Muñequito, Mexican retired masked professional wrestler (born 1966)

Television series
 Angelito: Batang Ama, Filipino TV series about under-aged fatherhood
 Angelito (TV series), a Filipino daytime drama series

Songs
 "Angelito" (Aventura song), 2005
 "Angelito" (Don Omar song), 2006
 "Angelito" (René y René song), 1964

See also
 "Tu Angelito", a 2010 song by Chino & Nacho

Filipino masculine given names